The Filmfare Best Comedien Award – Tamil was given by the Filmfare magazine as part of its annual Filmfare Awards South for Tamil  (Kollywood) films between 2002 and 2005..

The award was introduced and first given at the 50th South Filmfare Awards in 2002, with Vivek being the first comedian to receive the award for his performance in Run. This category has been retired since 2006.

Winners

Nominations

2000s
2003 Vivek - Saamy as Venkatraman
 Vadivelu - Winner as Kaipullai
 Vivek - Dhool as Narayana Swamy (Narain)

References

Sources

External links
52nd Annual Awards

Comedian